Ganseok Station is a station on Seoul Metropolitan Subway Line 1 and Gyeongin Line.

References

Metro stations in Incheon
Seoul Metropolitan Subway stations
Railway stations opened in 1994
Namdong District